Roberto Luco can refer to:

 Roberto Luco (footballer, born 1907)
 Roberto Luco (footballer, born 1985)